"Playing With My Heart"  is a song by Italian DJ Alex Gaudino, taken from his second studio album Doctor Love (2013).  The song was released from 28 January 2013 by Ultra Records. The song was written by Jenson Vaughan, Jason Derulo, Alex Fortunato Gaudino and Giuseppe D'Albenzio. The song features vocals from Canadian R&B recording artist JRDN.

Music video
A music video to accompany the release of "Playing With My Heart" was first released onto YouTube on March 13, 2013 at a total length of three minutes and seventeen seconds.

Track listing

Chart performance

Weekly charts

Release history

References

2012 singles
2012 songs
Songs written by Jason Derulo
Ultra Music singles
Songs written by Alex Gaudino
Songs written by Jenson Vaughan
Alex Gaudino songs